Chiganaki 1-ye is a rural locality (a khutor) in Krasnyanskoye Rural Settlement, Kumylzhensky District, Volgograd Oblast, Russia. The population was 138 as of 2010.

Geography 
Chiganaki 1-ye is located in forest steppe, on Khopyorsko-Buzulukskaya Plain, 38 km southeast of Kumylzhenskaya (the district's administrative centre) by road. Chiginaki 2-ye is the nearest rural locality.

References 

Rural localities in Kumylzhensky District